The 2006 Italian Grand Prix (officially the Formula 1 Gran Premio Vodafone d'Italia 2006) was a Formula One motor race held on 10 September 2006 at Autodromo Nazionale di Monza. It was the fifteenth race of the 2006 Formula One season, and was won by Michael Schumacher driving a Ferrari car.

Immediately following the race, Michael Schumacher announced that he would retire from motor racing at the end of the 2006 season. Robert Kubica achieved his first career podium finish, in only his third Grand Prix. It was also only the second Grand Prix meeting appearance of Kubica's Friday driver successor, Sebastian Vettel. The race was also the first race to see the introduction of a new High Speed Barrier developed by the FIA Institute and the FIA. The system, which was installed at the end of the run-off areas at the circuit’s second chicane and Parabolica corners, was designed for use at corners with high speed approaches and limited run-off areas. Also this was the last race of the Red Bull driver Christian Klien, until his return to a race seat at the 2010 Singapore Grand Prix.

After the race, in the press conference, Michael Schumacher announced his retirement from Formula One. The race was his 90th victory.

Friday drivers
The bottom 6 teams in the 2005 Constructors' Championship and Super Aguri were entitled to run a third car in free practice on Friday. These drivers drove on Friday but did not compete in qualifying or the race.

Race report

At the start Kimi Räikkönen got away in the lead with Michael Schumacher and Nick Heidfeld tussling over 2nd. By lap 2 Fernando Alonso was up to 6th past Heidfeld as Schumacher and Räikkönen begin to pull clear of the rest. On lap 10 Nico Rosberg lost power in his Williams and was the first retirement, his 4th consecutive retirement. On lap 15 Räikkönen pitted from the lead and two laps later Schumacher came in and jumped him, Robert Kubica took the lead stopping much later, on lap 23, which allowed Schumacher into the lead for the first time in the race. On lap 44 there was drama when Alonso pulled over with a smoky Renault after an engine failure, this caused a problem for Massa who locked up behind him and went off before pitting to change tyres. Michael Schumacher cruised to victory ahead of Räikkönen, with Kubica claiming his first podium in 3rd place.

Classification

Qualifying

Notes
  – Fernando Alonso originally qualified with a time of 1:21.829 in Q3, but had his three fastest Q3 times deleted, effectively demoting him from fifth to tenth, after Monza stewards controversially penalized him, judging he had impeded Ferrari's Felipe Massa during qualifying.

Race

Championship standings after the race

Drivers' Championship standings

Constructors' Championship standings

 Note: Only the top five positions are included for both sets of standings.
 Bold text indicates competitors who still had a theoretical chance of becoming World Champion.

See also 
 2006 Monza GP2 Series round

References

Italian Grand Prix
Italian Grand Prix
Grand Prix
September 2006 sports events in Europe